This is the third of three pages that lists all of the High School athletic conferences located in state of Indiana under the Indiana High School Athletic Association (IHSAA).

Indiana's Class System
Indiana's classes are determined by student enrollment, broken into classes of roughly equal size depending on sport. The 2011-12 school year marks a change in the classification period, as schools are reclassified in all class sports biennially instead of quadrennially.

It is also important to note that some schools (mostly private) are placed in classes higher than their enrollment. This is due to a new IHSAA rule that took effect for the 2012-13 year that dictates that a school that has made two appearances at the state championships in a row, win or lose, is automatically moved up into the next class.

Schools' sports teams for 2020-21 through 2022-23 are separated into classes as follows:

Most sports:
Class A:  <325 Students.
Class AA: 325-565 Students.
Class AAA: 566-1089 Students.
Class AAAA: >1089 Students.

Football:
Class A: <418 students
Class AA: 418-591 students
Class AAA: 592-849 students
Class AAAA: 850-1499 students
Class AAAAA: 1500-2099 Students
Class AAAAAA: >2100 Students 

Soccer:
Class A: <499 students
Class AA: 500-1000 students
Class AAA: >1000 Students

Conferences

Ohio River Valley Conference

Patoka Lake Conference

Pioneer Conference

Pocket Athletic Conference

Tecumseh is Independent in football but plays in the PAC in all other sports.

Porter County Conference

 South Central plays football in the Greater South Shore Conference. Boone Grove is independent in football.

Sagamore Conference

Southern Athletic Conference

Southern Indiana Athletic Conference

Southwestern Indiana Conference

Southwest Seven Football Conference

Summit Athletic Conference
02 Allen County 
Fort Wayne, Indiana

Three Rivers Conference

Tri-Eastern Conference

Wabash River Conference

West Central Conference

Western Indiana Conference

See also
 Page 1: Allen County Conference - Metropolitan Interscholastic Conference
 Page 2: Mid-Eastern Conference - Northwestern Conference

References

External links
 IHSAA Conferences
 IHSAA Directory